AIDC may refer to:

Aerospace
Aerospace Industrial Development Corporation, Taiwanese aerospace company
AIDC AT-3, military trainer aircraft manufactured 1984–1990
AIDC F-CK-1 Ching-kuo, fighter aircraft introduced in 1994
AIDC PL-1B, two-seat trainer aircraft introduced in 1962
AIDC T-CH-1, trainer aircraft introduced in 1973
AIDC UH-1H, utility helicopter manufactured 1956–1987
AIDC XC-2, civil transport aircraft introduced in 1978

Industrial development
Arkansas Industrial Development Commission, first run by Winthrop Rockefeller in 1955
Australian Industry Development Corporation (1970-2010), and its subsidiary AIDC Ltd, Australian government statutory body

Other
Australian International Documentary Conference, a conference for the promotion of documentary, factual and unscripted screen content
AIDC Awards, awards given for documentary films and TV programs
Automatic identification and data capture, methods of identifying objects, collecting data about them, and entering them directly into computer systems, without human involvement